Kevin Townson (born 19 April 1983) in Liverpool, England, is an English professional footballer who plays as a striker for Warrington Town.currently at the Copplehouse vets

Career 
He has played for Rochdale and Macclesfield Town in the Football League. Townson won the Bill Fleming Media Player of the Year in the Victorian Premier League in 2010 for the Melbourne Knights. He has subsequently returned to England.

He also played for Fazakerley Veterans F.C.

References

External links

1983 births
Living people
Footballers from Liverpool
English footballers
Association football forwards
Everton F.C. players
Rochdale A.F.C. players
Scarborough F.C. players
Macclesfield Town F.C. players
Northwich Victoria F.C. players
The New Saints F.C. players
Droylsden F.C. players
Melbourne Knights FC players
AFC Fylde players
Warrington Town F.C. players
Bootle F.C. players
Expatriate footballers in Wales
English Football League players
Expatriate soccer players in Australia
English expatriate sportspeople in Australia
English expatriate footballers